Choriolaus filicornis is a species of beetle in the family Cerambycidae. It was described by Linsley and Chemsak in 1971.

References

Choriolaus
Beetles described in 1971